Cagle Mill (also known as Hoosier Highlands) is an unincorporated community in Washington Township, Putnam County, in the U.S. state of Indiana.

History
Cagle Mill was founded in 1924.

Geography

References

Unincorporated communities in Putnam County, Indiana
Unincorporated communities in Indiana